The Easy Fire was a wildfire that burned in Simi Valley, Ventura County, California. The fire burned  in October 2019.

Fire
The Easy Fire began October 30, 2019 at approximately 6am near a Southern California Edison transmission line, which was still active amid a public safety power shutoff due to high winds.  The point of ignition was near Easy Street and Madera Road at the westerly end of Simi.

The fire was extinguished on November 2, 2019. The final report of investigators determined that the combination of extreme wind conditions and an insulator, attached to high voltage power lines, that swung into a steel power pole caused the fire.

Impact 
As the fire was pushed towards Moorpark on October 30,  over 1,000 homes were threatened and 26,000 Ventura County residents were evacuated due to the fire. The Ronald Reagan Presidential Library was almost completely surrounded by the fire. Goats were credited in protecting the rural, hillside museum. They had earlier cleared the brush to create a defensible space around the buildings.

See also
2019 California wildfires

References

Wildfires in Ventura County, California
2019 California wildfires